The Paracenoceratidae are an extinct family of prehistoric nautiloids.  The cephalopods lived during the Jurassic and Cretaceous periods.

Genera
Aulacenoceras
Paracenoceras
Somalinautilus
Tithonoceras

References

Prehistoric nautiloid families
Jurassic cephalopods
Cretaceous cephalopods
Middle Jurassic first appearances
Albian extinctions